Arseny (officially transliterated as Arsenii) (also Arsenii and Arseniy) is a name, derived from Arsenius. Notable people with the name include:

Arseny
 Arseny Avraamov (1886–1944), Russian avant-garde composer and theorist
 Arseny Bondarev (born 1985), Russian ice hockey player
 Arseny Borrero (born 1979), Cuban sport shooter
 Arseny of Winnipeg (Andrew Chagovstov) (1866–1945), bishop of the Russian Orthodox Greek Catholic Church in America
 Arseny Golenishchev-Kutuzov (1848–1913), Russian poet
 Arseny Koreshchenko (1870–1921), Russian pianist and composer 
 Arseny Logashov (born 1991), Russian football
 Arseny Matseyevich (1697–1772), Russian archbishop
 Arseny Meshchersky (1834–1902), Russian landscape painter
 Arseny Pavlov (1983-2016), Russian landscape painter
 Arseny Roginsky (born 1946), Soviet dissident and Russian historian
 Arseny Semionov (1911–1992), Soviet Russian painter and art teacher
 Arseny Sokolov (1910–1986), Russian theoretical physicist
 Arseny Tarkovsky (1907–1989), Soviet poet and translator
 Arseny Vvedensky (1844–1909), Russian literary critic, historian, essayist and author
 Arseny Zakrevsky (1783 or 1786–1865), Russian statesman and Minister of the Interior
 Arseny Zverev (1900–1969), Soviet Russian politician, economist and statesman

Spiritual Fathers
 Father Arseny, central figure of two books by Vera Bouteneff concerning a spiritual father in the former Soviet Union during the period of communist

Arseni

Given name
 Arseni Comas (born 1961), Spanish football player
 Arseni Markov (born 1981), Canadian-Russian competitive ice dancer

Surname
 Alexandru Arseni, Moldovan politician

Arseniy
 Arseniy Golovko (1906–1962), Soviet admiral
 Arseniy Lavrentyev (born 1983), Russian-born Portuguese swimmer
 Arseniy Vorozheykin (1912–2001), commander in the Soviet Air Force
 Arseniy Yatsenyuk (born 1974), Ukrainian politician, economist and lawyer